The 2017 Missouri Tigers football team represented the University of Missouri in the 2017 NCAA Division I FBS football season. The Tigers played their home games at Faurot Field in Columbia, Missouri and competed in the Eastern Division of the Southeastern Conference (SEC). They were led by second-year head coach Barry Odom. They finished the season 7–6, 4–4 in SEC play to finish in a tie for third place in the Eastern Division. They were invited to the Texas Bowl where they lost to Texas.

On November 24, quarterback Drew Lock broke the SEC passing record for touchdowns in a season with 43, in a 48–45 win over Arkansas.

Recruiting

Position key

Recruits

The Tigers signed a total of 25 recruits.

Schedule
Missouri announced its 2017 football schedule on September 13, 2016. The 2017 schedule consists of 7 home games and 5 away games in the regular season. The Tigers will host SEC foes Auburn, Florida, South Carolina, and Tennessee, and will travel to Arkansas, Georgia, Kentucky, and Vanderbilt.

The Tigers will host three of its four non–conference games which are against Idaho from the Sun Belt Conference, Missouri State from the Missouri Valley Football Conference, Purdue from the Big Ten Conference and travel to UConn from the American Athletic Conference.

Schedule Source:

Roster

References

Missouri
Missouri Tigers football seasons
Missouri Tigers football